Helsinki Railway Square is an open square immediately to the east of the Helsinki Central railway station in central Helsinki in Finland. The square serves as Helsinki's secondary bus station along with the main Kamppi Center bus station.  The north side features the Finnish National Theatre, and the south side is formed of the Ateneum classical art museum (part of the Finnish National Gallery).  To the west side are the two ornate entrances to Helsinki Central station—a bigger one for public use, and a smaller one exclusively for the President of Finland and their official guests.  The square is served by the Helsinki Metro system with Rautatientori metro station entrances at the south-west corner, and University of Helsinki metro station to the east.

During summer afternoons and evenings, the pub tram Spårakoff departs from the  tram stop in the square once per hour.

Rautatientori gallery

See also 
 Eliel Square

Squares in Helsinki
Kluuvi